The Civil Aviation Administration of China (CAAC) is the Chinese civil aviation authority under the Ministry of Transport. It oversees civil aviation and investigates aviation accidents and incidents. 

As the aviation authority responsible for China, it concludes civil aviation agreements with other aviation authorities, including those of the Special administrative regions of China which are categorized as "special domestic." It directly operated its own airline, China's aviation monopoly, until 1988. The agency is headquartered in Dongcheng District, Beijing.

The CAAC does not share the responsibility of managing China's airspace with the Central Military Commission under the regulations in the Civil Aviation Law of the People's Republic of China.

History
On November 2, 1949, shortly after the founding of the People's Republic of China, the CCP Central Committee decided to found the Civil Aviation Agency under the name of the People's Revolutionary Military Commission, and under the command of the People's Liberation Army Air Force, to manage all non-military aviation in the country, as well as provide general and commercial flight services. The Civil Aviation Agency was created in December of the same year, and set offices in Chongqing, Guangzhou, Shanghai, Tianjin, and Wuhan. On March 10, 1950, the Guangzhou Office began to work, managing civil flight services in Guangdong, Guangxi, and Hunan. Later, it was merged with Wuhan Office to form the Civil Aviation Office of Central and Southern China on January 21, 1951, in Guangzhou, and was renamed Central and Southern Civil Aviation Office, working for civil flight administrations in Guangdong, Guangxi, Hubei, and Hunan.

On May 7, 1952, the People's Revolutionary Military Commission and the State Council issued the Decision for Reorganizing Civil Aviation and the Civil Aviation Agency of the People's Revolutionary Military Commission was transferred to the military system and was under the direct control of the PLA Air Force, then split the civil aviation administration division and airline division to form the separate Civil Aviation Agency and civil airline. Under this decision, from July to November 1951, the Civil Aviation Agency had four administration offices in Shanghai (Eastern China), Guangzhou (Central-Southern), Chongqing (Southwestern China), and Tianjin (Northern China). The Southern China branch was briefly renamed the Civil Aviation Administration Office of Southern China. On July 17, 1952, the People's Aviation Company of China was created, headquartered in Tianjin.

On 9 June 1953, following Aeroflot in the Soviet Union, the People's Aviation Company of China was merged with the Civil Aviation Agency of the Central Revolutionary Military Commission. Later, the SKOGA was merged with the Beijing administration office on January 1, 1955.

In November 1954, the Civil Aviation Agency of the People's Revolutionary Military Commission was renamed Civil Aviation Agency of China. It was transferred to the State Council and came under the leadership of both State Council and PLA Air Force. The PLA Air Force was also responsible for technical, flight, aircrew, communicating, human resources, and political works.

On February 27, 1958, the Civil Aviation Agency was transferred to the Ministry of Transport. Later, the Agency ratified the Report for the Opinions of System Devolving from the party branch of the Ministry of Transport in June 17. Both national and local authorities have responsibilities of civil aviation. International and main domestic flights were mainly under the leadership of the national authority while local and agricultural flights were mainly under the leadership of local authority. Thus, most provinces and autonomous regions established their own civil aviation administration offices. Five administration offices in Beijing, Chengdu, Guangzhou, Shanghai, Tianjin, and Ürümqi were changed to be regional administration agencies in December 13. The Agency was renamed the General Administration of Civil Aviation of the Ministry of Transport on November 17, 1960.

In April 1962, the Presidium of the 2nd National People's Congress decided to rename the General Administration of Civil Aviation of the Ministry of Transport to the General Administration of Civil Aviation of China on the 53rd meeting. It was transferred to the State Council and was managed by the PLA Air Force. The General Administration of Civil Aviation was transferred to the PLA Air Force on November 20, 1969.

In 1963, China purchased six Vickers Viscount aircraft from Great Britain, followed in 1971 by the purchase of four Hawker Siddeley Trident aircraft from Pakistan International Airlines.  In August 1971, the airline purchased six Trident 2Es directly from Hawker Siddeley.  The country also placed provisional orders for three Concorde aircraft.  With the 1972 Nixon visit to China, the country ordered 10 Boeing 707 jets. In December 1973, it took the unprecedented step of borrowing £40 million from Western banks to fund the purchase of 15 additional Trident jets. Soviet-built Ilyushin Il-62 aircraft were used on long range routes during the 1970s and 1980s.

On March 5, 1980, the General Administration of Civil Aviation was no longer managed by the PLA Air Force, and was transferred to the State Council. Some administrative works were still under the People's Liberation Army and the air controlling was managed by PLA General Stuff Department and Air Force Command.

On January 30, 1987, the State Council ratified the Report for the Reform Solution and Executive Steps of the Civil Aviation System Administration System. Since then, CAAC acted solely as a government agency and reorganized six regional administration agencies, and no longer provided commercial flight services. In 1988, CAAC Airlines was divided into a number of individual air carriers, many of them named after the region of China where it had its hub.

On April 19, 1993, the General Administration of Civil Aviation became the ministry-level agency of the State Council.

In March 2008, CAAC was made a subsidiary of the newly-created Ministry of Transport, and its official Chinese name was slightly adjusted to reflect its being no longer a ministry-level agency. Its official English name has remained Civil Aviation Administration of China.

On 11 March 2019, the CAAC was the first civil aviation authority to ground the Boeing 737 MAX. After so doing, most of the world's aviation authorities grounded the MAX, including the European Union Aviation Safety Agency the next day. It took the US Federal Aviation Administration until 13 March to ground the MAX. Aviation commentators saw this as having bolstered the global reputation of the CAAC at the expense of the FAA. After the MAX was cleared to return by the FAA in November 2020, the CAAC reiterated that there "is no set timetable" to lifting the MAX grounding in China. In early August 2021, a MAX made a test flight in Shanghai for validation. Later, the CAAC issued an airworthiness directive on December 2 to allow the type return to service if the MCAS is corrected following Boeing's instructions.

CAAC Airlines

Current role 
Currently, CAAC is an administrative department mostly intended to supervise the aviation market. CAAC releases route applications every week and for routes that don't fly to an open-sky country/region, there will be monthly scoring releases that determine the score for each of them. CAAC subsequently grants permission to start on those who score highest on the list.

CAAC also issues frequent operation data and notices.

List of directors
List of Directors of the Civil Aviation Administration of China:

Zhong Chibing (November 1949 – October 1952)
Zhu Huizhao (October 1952 – June 1955)
Kuang Rennong (June 1955 – June 1973)
Ma Renhui (June 1973 – June 1975)
Liu Cunxin (June 1975 – December 1977)
Shen Tu (December 1977 – March 1985)
Hu Yizhou (March 1985 – February 1991)
Jiang Zhuping (February 1991 – December 1993)
Chen Guangyi (December 1993 – June 1998)
Liu Jianfeng (June 1998 – May 2002)
Yang Yuanyuan (May 2002 – December 2007)
Li Jiaxiang (December 2007 – January 2016)
Feng Zhenglin (January 2016 – present)

Affiliate subsidiaries 
 Air Traffic Administration Bureau (ATMB) in Beijing
 Civil Aviation University of China (CAUC) in Tianjin
 Civil Aviation Flight University of China (CAFUC) in Guanghan
 Civil Aviation Management Institute of China (CAMIC) in Beijing
 China Academy of Civil Aviation Science and Technology — Center of Aviation Safety Technology, CAAC in Beijing
 CAAC Second Research Institute in Chengdu
 China Civil Aviation Publishing Press in Beijing
 Civil Aviation Medical Center — Civil Aviation General Hospital in Beijing
 CAAC Settlement Center in Beijing
 CAAC Information Center in Beijing
 CAAC Audition Center in Beijing
 Capital Airports Holdings Limited (CAH) in Beijing
 CAAC International Cooperation and Service Center in Beijing
 China Airport Construction Corporation (CACC) in Beijing
 China Civil Aviation Engine Airworthiness Audition Center
 Flight Inspection Center of CAAC in Beijing
 CAAC Museum

See also 

 Transport in the People's Republic of China
 List of airports in the People's Republic of China
 China's busiest airports by passenger traffic
 List of airlines of the People's Republic of China
 Civil aviation in China
 Civil Aviation Department (Hong Kong)
 Civil Aviation Authority (Macau)

External links 

 CAAC Official site 
 CAAC Official site (Archive)
 Flight Inspection Center of CAAC /
 China - Civil Aviation
 Civil Aviation Management Institute of China, Civil Aviation Safety Institute 
 Flight Information Region In China

References 

 
Aviation in China
Air navigation service providers
Dongcheng District, Beijing
1949 establishments in China
Organizations established in 1949